Sheppard Crater is a distinctive breached crater rising to 200 m about 0.8 miles (1.3 km) east of Castle Rock on Hut Point Peninsula, Ross Island. Named in 2000 by New Zealand Geographic Board (NZGB) after Deirdre Jeanette Sheppard, DSIR Antarctic Division/NZAP/Antarctica NZ librarian, 1980–96, who worked one season at Vanda Station.

Volcanoes of Ross Island